A suicide bombing of a crowded public bus (Egged bus 2) in the Shmuel HaNavi quarter in Jerusalem took place on August 19, 2003. Twenty-four people were killed and over 130 wounded. Many of the victims were children, some of them infants. The Islamist militant group Hamas claimed responsibility for the attack.

Attack
On August 19, 2003 (22 Av 5763), a Hamas suicide bomber sent out by the organization's Hebron cell disguised himself as a Haredi Jew and detonated himself on a No. 2 Egged bus traveling through Jerusalem's Shmuel HaNavi neighborhood. He blew himself up after entering the back door. The double-length bus was crowded with Orthodox Jewish children returning from a visit to the Western Wall. In addition to the perpetrator, the huge explosion killed 7 children and 16 adults, among them a woman who was eight months' pregnant, and injured more than 130 people. The bomb was spiked with ball-bearings designed to increase injuries on the crowded bus. Hamas said the bomber was a 29-year-old mosque preacher from the city of Hebron.

Because so many of the dead and injured were children, the media dubbed it the "children's bus". According to an Associated Press report,

Perpetrators
Both Hamas and Islamic Jihad claimed responsibility for the attack. According to Tariq Ali, however, the bombing was carried out by a "self-proclaimed 'Hamas' cell from Hebron, disowned and denounced by the official leadership." The attack put an end to the so-called Hudna that had been announced in July 2003. United States president George W. Bush sent his condolences to the victims' families. The European Commission also denounced what it called the "devastating terrorist attack" and called on the Palestinian Authority to intervene to bring a halt to such acts:

The European Commission strongly condemns last night's devastating terrorist attack in Jerusalem and expresses its sincere condolences to the families of the victims and to the Israeli Government. This is an attack on all the forces working for peace. The European Commission calls on the Palestinian Authority to do everything in its powers to prevent such unacceptable and unjustified act of violence, and urges the PA and the Israeli Government to pursue their dialogue and common efforts towards peace as set out in the Road Map.

Aftermath
Following the attack, Israeli forces arrested 17 Palestinians suspected of being Hamas activists, including several of the bomber's relatives, while Hamas leader Ismail Abu Shanab and his two bodyguards were killed by an Israeli helicopter missile strike in Gaza.

In 2004 a memorial plaque to the victims was erected in the Beit Yisrael neighborhood of Jerusalem. The name of the only non-Jewish victim, Maria Antonia Reslas, was engraved separately from the names of the other victims, with the title "Mrs" rather than the title "sainted" (kadosh) used for the Jews, resulting in some controversy.

See also
Civilian casualties in the Second Intifada
Dizengoff Center suicide bombing
Israeli casualties of war
Kiryat Menachem bus bombing
Patt junction bus bombing

References

External links
 Bus bombing in Jerusalem kills at least 18, injures more than 100 – published on NPR on August 19, 2003
 18 killed, over 110 hurt in Jerusalem bus bomb – published on Haaretz on August 20, 2003
 Bus bomb carnage in Jerusalem – published on BBC News on August 20, 2003
 Bomber his bus carrying Israeli families 18 die, 100 wounded; children among victims  – published on the Boston Globe on August 20, 2003
 Suicide bombing of No. 2 Egged bus in Jerusalem August 19, 2003 – published at the Israeli Ministry of Foreign Affairs

Mass murder in 2003
Suicide bombings in 2003
Israeli casualties in the Second Intifada
Terrorist incidents in Jerusalem
Hamas suicide bombings of buses
Murdered Israeli children
2003 in Jerusalem
August 2003 events in Asia
Islamic terrorist incidents in 2003
Terrorist incidents in Jerusalem in the 2000s